Houma North railway station is a freight railway station in Houma, Linfen, Shanxi, China. It is an intermediate stop on the Datong–Puzhou railway. It is said to be the largest marshalling yard in North China.

References 

Railway stations in Shanxi